The Story of Tracy Beaker (also known as Tracy Beaker or TSOTB) is a British television programme adapted from the book of the same name by Jacqueline Wilson. It ran on CBBC for five series, from 2002 to 2005 and also contained a feature-length episode, Tracy Beaker's Movie of Me, broadcast in 2004, as well as a week of interactive episodes for Children in Need. The theme song was written and performed by Keisha White. All of the five series have been released on DVD and the entire first series had been made available on Netflix, but for unknown reasons it was later removed. Series 1–3 has been added onto Amazon Prime.

Series overview

Episodes

Series 1 (2002)

Series 2 (2003)

Series 3 (2003–2004)

Television film (2004)

Series 4 (2004–2005)

Series 5 (2005)

Spin off media

Tracy Beaker Survival Files (2011–2012)

A thirteen part series entitled "Tracy Beaker Survival Files" was aired and featured clips from Tracy Beaker Returns and The Story of Tracy Beaker.

See also
 List of Tracy Beaker Returns episodes
 List of The Dumping Ground episodes

References

 
Lists of British children's television series episodes
Tracy Beaker series